The Minnesota Supercomputing Institute (MSI) in Minneapolis, Minnesota is a core research facility of the University of Minnesota that provides hardware and software resources, as well as technical user support, to faculty and researchers at the university and at other institutions of higher education in Minnesota. MSI is located in Walter Library, on the university's Twin Cities campus.

History 

In 1981, the University of Minnesota became the first U.S. university to acquire a supercomputer, a Cray-1. The Minnesota Supercomputing Institute was created in 1984 to provide high-performance computing resources to the University of Minnesota's research community. MSI currently has three HPC systems available for use.

MSI is part of Research Computing in the Office of the Vice President for Research. Research Computing is an umbrella organization that comprises the Minnesota Supercomputing Institute, the University of Minnesota Informatics Institute, and U-Spatial.

Memberships 
MSI is a member of the Coalition for Academic Scientific Computation, the Minnesota High Tech Association, the Great Lakes Consortium, and the Extreme Science and Engineering Discovery Environment (XSEDE).

Mission 

The Minnesota Supercomputing Institute seeks to provide researchers at the University of Minnesota and at other institutions of higher education in the state of Minnesota access to high-performance computing resources and user support to facilitate successful and cutting-edge research in all disciplines, help researchers attract funding, contribute to undergraduate and graduate education, and benefit the broader community.

MSI is committed to expanding and developing the types of service it offers in order to continue to play its key support role across the growing spectrum of scientific fields.

MSI is also committed to facilitating University-industry collaboration and to promoting technology transfer through the interchange of ideas in the field of supercomputing research, including the dissemination of results of research accomplished with MSI resources.

Supercomputing capabilities

HPC resources 

Agate - HPE cluster with HPE and AMD CPU nodes and NVidia GPU nodes

Mangi - Heterogeneous HPE cluster; AMD processors tightly integrated via high-speed Infiniband network

Mesabi - HPE Linux distributed cluster; Intel processor tightly integrated via very high-speed communication network

MSI HPE overview

Laboratories

 LCSE-MSI Visualization Laboratory (LMVL)
 Scientific Development and Visualization (SDVL)

References 
 Moore, Rick. "Blade Runner : UMNews." University of Minnesota. Web. 29 July 2010. http://www1.umn.edu/news/features/2009/UR_CONTENT_148391.html
 Vance, Ashlee. "Minnesota’s Enormous Apples Computer - Bits Blog - NYTimes.com." Technology - Bits Blog - NYTimes.com. Web. 29 July 2010. http://bits.blogs.nytimes.com/2009/12/10/minnesotas-enormous-apples-computer/?smid=pl-share

External links 
 Minnesota Supercomputing Institute
 University of Minnesota

University of Minnesota
Supercomputers
University and college laboratories in the United States
Computer science institutes in the United States
Research institutes in Minnesota